An intelligent pump is a pump that has the ability to regulate and control flow or pressure. Typical advantages are energy savings, lifetime improvements and system cost reductions. Intelligent pumps are used in boilers and systems, temperature control, water treatment, industrial water supply, wash and clean, machining and desalination.

References

Further reading

External links
Market overview intelligent pumps
Intelligent pump system control market

Manufacturers
Pump control system
Chemical pump
Intelligent micro pump
Residential water pump

Pumps